Linolenic acid is a type of naturally-occurring fatty acid. It can refer to either of two octadecatrienoic acids (i.e. with an 18-carbon chain and three double bonds, which are found in the cis configuration), or a mixture of the two.  Linolenate (in the form of triglyceride esters of linolenic acid) is often found in vegetable oils; traditionally, such fatty acylates are reported as the fatty acids:

α-Linolenic acid, an omega-3 (n-3) fatty acid
γ-Linolenic acid, an omega-6 (n-6) fatty acid

See also
 Linoleic acid, a similarly named fatty acid

References

Alkenoic acids
Aromatase inhibitors
Fatty acids
Essential fatty acids
Essential nutrients